Hecklingen is a town in the Salzlandkreis district, in Saxony-Anhalt, Germany.

International relations

Hecklingen is twinned with:

 Nisko in Poland

References

Towns in Saxony-Anhalt
Salzlandkreis
Duchy of Anhalt